Baghlujeh-ye Aqa (also Romanized as Bāghlūjeh-ye Āqā; also known as Baghlūjah, Bāghlūjeh, and Bagludzhakh) is a village in Zanjanrud-e Pain Rural District, Zanjanrud District, Zanjan County, Zanjan Province, Iran. At the 2006 census, its population was 220, in 53 families.

References 

Populated places in Zanjan County